"Close Friends" is a song by American rapper Lil Baby. It was released on February 2, 2019, as the second single from Drip Harder, his collaborative mixtape with Gunna. The track was produced  by Turbo. The love story-esque video, shot in Paris, France, was released on February 13, 2019, a day before Valentine's Day, and features Lil Baby and his real-life girlfriend. The song reached number one on the Billboard Rhythmic Songs airplay chart.

Music video

The music video was released a day before Valentine's Day 2019. Directed by Daps, it was filmed in Paris, France, during Lil Baby's first-ever trip to Paris. Lil Baby felt Paris represents love and romance, and therefore chose to shoot it there. The video features him and his real-life girlfriend Jayda Cheaves, having a romantic outdoor dinner with the Eiffel Tower in view. The visual recounts their relationship and concludes with the two having a fall out.
As of September 2021, the video has over 200 million views on YouTube.

Critical reception
Revolts Chase Ichiki called the track a standout from Drip Harder.

Charts

Weekly charts

Year-end charts

Certifications

References

2018 singles
2018 songs
Lil Baby songs
Songs written by Lil Baby
Songs written by Turbo (record producer)
Song recordings produced by Turbo (record producer)